The Mark Levin Show is a conservative talk radio show hosted by Mark Levin. The program is broadcast nationwide on Westwood One and reaches an estimated seven million weekly listeners, according to an estimate from Talkers Magazine. The Talkers estimate puts Levin's listenership in a tie with The Glenn Beck Radio Program for fourth-most-listened-to talk radio show in the United States and, counting all radio formats, is the seventh-most-listened-to radio program in the United States.

History

Levin began his  career as a radio host in 2002 in a Sunday afternoon timeslot on WABC. WABC assigned Levin to fill in starting on June 16, 2003 after the station dropped The Savage Nation for the 7–9 pm.time period weeknights. On September 2, 2003, his show moved to the 6–7 p.m. timeslot on WABC. Levin's WABC program expanded to 2 hours starting May 17, 2004.

On January 30, 2006, ABC Radio Networks began syndicating the show. Initially, ABC expanded the program to three other stations, including WMAL in Levin's local Washington metropolitan area. On February 2, 2009, the program expanded to 3 hours (6–9 p.m. ET). ABC's radio assets later changed hands to Citadel Broadcasting in 2007, then to Cumulus Media in 2011; in 2013, Cumulus combined all of its radio assets under the banner of Westwood One. Levin signed a five-year contract extension with Westwood One in January 2015.

The Mark Levin Show can be heard on over 150 stations and the SIRIUS XM Patriot channel. Levin's show has been rated number one in its time slot in New York, Chicago, Detroit, Dallas–Fort Worth and Washington, D.C.

On June 25, 2018, Levin was elected into the Radio Hall of Fame.

Format
His radio show, a mix of political and social commentary from a conservative point of view, covers legal issues, including decisions of the Supreme Court of the United States. Levin follows the conventional talk radio model of taking listener calls throughout the show; he is often hostile to callers opposing his views, frequently cutting them off with words like "get off my phone, you idiot."

The show's program segments often feature Levin recounting contemporary news items and controversies. The pace of these segments starts as slow and brooding and eventually escalate into Levin angrily shouting questions at "Mr. Producer" (Rich Sementa, Executive Producer of the program), who does not have a speaking role on the show.

Levin uses his own on-air jargon, some of which he invented and some of which he popularized. He uses disparaging nicknames for mainstream media outlets, such as "New York Slimes" for The New York Times, "Washington Compost" for The Washington Post, or "MSLSD" for MSNBC.

References

External links
 Official website

2002 radio programme debuts
Conservative talk radio
Sirius XM Radio programs
Westwood One